The Konkow language, also known as Northwest Maidu (also Concow-Maidu, or  in the language itself) is a part of the Maiduan language group.  It is spoken in California.  It is severely endangered, with three remaining elders who learned to speak it as a first language, one of whom is deaf. As part of an effort to regain official recognition as a federally recognized tribe, an effort to provide language instruction amongst the descendants of the original tribe and affiliated family members has begun.

In the name ,  means "meadow", with the additional  creating the adjective form of the word.

Dialects
One source supports the claim that Northwest Maidu had at least nine dialects, designated today according to the locality in which each was spoken.  These dialects were: Otaki, Mikchopdo, Cherokee, Eskeni, Pulga, Nemsu, Feather Falls, Challenge, and Bidwell Bar.  Lexica of each remain scant.  In addition, there may have been many family variations within each dialect group; thus, certainly there was no one Konkow language, but Konkow means a phonologically distinct pronunciation from what is popularly defined as 'Maidu' or 'Mountain Maidu', namely in terms of stress patterns on lexicon.  According to limited historical data, by the turn of the 19th century there were only four of these dialects still being spoken.

Alternate names 
The name "Konkow" has been variously spelled Concow and Konkau.  The language is also known as Maidu (Meidoo), Holólupai, Michopdo, Nákum, Secumne (Sekumne), Tsamak, Yuba, and the pejorative "Digger".

Modern Konkow
Since 2002, a dialect which could be called "Modern Konkow," based on what is conventionally called the Cherokee dialect of Konkow, has come into limited use by some California Native Americans with cultural and familial ties to the old Konkow tribe.  This dialect is primarily based on the dialect as learned by Mary Jones, one of the last speakers of Old Konkow, who learned the dialect that was spoken in the vicinity of Cherokee, California.  It is being promulgated with a DVD-based course of study called "Twenty-two Lessons in the Koyoongkʼawi Language".

As of 2010, .mp3 learning materials of the Mechoopda dialect were also available, based on old recordings of Emma Cooper, made during the 1940s as a part of the war effort. Also based on the Emma Cooper recordings, a "Konkow Toddler" app was released for iPhone, iPad, and other iOS devices in July 2012.

Materials for study of the Northwest Maidu language, including the 22-lesson course mentioned above, have been made available on the website of the Konkow Maidu Cultural Preservation Association.

Phonology

Consonants 

The affricate /t͡sʼ/ may also be realized as ~ allophonically.

Vowels 

Vowel length is also present.

References

External links

 Konkow language overview at the Survey of California and Other Indian Languages
 Recording of Konkow Maidu
 Language Instruction available on Konkow Maidu Cultural Preservation Association website

 OLAC resources in and about the Northwest Maidu language
 Concow language, California Language Archive (archived from  March 4, 2016)
 Konkow Bibliography
 Konkow basic lexicon at the Global Lexicostatistical Database

Indigenous languages of California
Maiduan languages
Endangered Maiduan languages
Native American language revitalization